In music, Op. 53 stands for Opus number 53. Compositions that are assigned this number include:

 Beethoven – Piano Sonata No. 21
 Brahms – Alto Rhapsody
 Britten – Gloriana
 Chopin – Polonaise in A-flat major, Op. 53
 Dvořák – Violin Concerto
 Mendelssohn – Songs Without Words Book 4
 Prokofiev – Piano Concerto No. 4
 Schubert – Piano Sonata in D major, D 850
 Schumann – Romanzen & Balladen volume III (3 songs)
 Scriabin – Piano Sonata No. 5
 Sibelius – Pan and Echo
 Strauss – Symphonia Domestica
 Szymanowski – Stabat Mater
 Tchaikovsky – Orchestral Suite No. 2